Cristhian Fabián Paredes Maciel (born 18 May 1998) is a Paraguayan professional footballer who plays for Major League Soccer club Portland Timbers.

Career

Sol de América 
He was formed in the Club Sol de América academy. While he was in the Sub-17 category, Paredes was promoted to the First Division team by coach Daniel Garnero. He made his debut in the top category of Paraguayan soccer on January 23, 2016 with a 2–1 victory over Club Olimpia, in the first week of the 2016 Paraguayan Primera División season.

He kept being a constant starter of the first team of Club Sol de América. He scored his first goal in Paraguayan Primera División on May 8, 2016, against General Caballero Sport Club, a match valid for the 20th week of 2016 Paraguayan Primera División season.

He debuted internationally in an official match on August 10, 2016 in the 2016 Copa Sudamericana against C.D. Jorge Wilstermann of Bolivia, in the Luis Alfonso Giagni Stadium in Asunción. The final score was a 1–1 tie.

Club América 
On December 27, 2016 he was confirmed by Club América for the 2017 Clausura Tournament of Liga MX. He played his first match on February 14, 2017 against Club Atlético Zacatepec, with a 1–0 victory. He scored his first goal against Santos Laguna in a 2–1 loss in the Corona Stadium.

Portland Timbers 
On 2 February 2018, Paredes was acquired by Portland Timbers on loan from Mexican side Club América. The move was made permanent on 6 February 2020.

References

External links
National Football Teams profile

1998 births
Living people
Association football midfielders
Club América footballers
Expatriate footballers in Mexico
Expatriate soccer players in the United States
Major League Soccer players
Paraguay under-20 international footballers
Paraguayan expatriate footballers
Paraguayan expatriate sportspeople in Mexico
Paraguayan expatriate sportspeople in the United States
Paraguayan footballers
Paraguayan Primera División players
People from Paraguarí
Portland Timbers players
Club Sol de América footballers
People from Paraguarí Department